San José District is one of five districts of the province Pacasmayo in Peru.

Localities
Some localities in San José district are:
Cultambo
Cosque
Cruce de San José

References